NWA PowerrrTrip 2, part of the NWA Pop-Up Event series and second in the PowerrrTrip chronology, was a professional wrestling supercard produced by the National Wrestling Alliance (NWA) in conjunction with Tried-N-True Pro Wrestling. The event took place on April 30, at the Valor Hall in Oak Grove, Kentucky. The event was a taping for NWA Power and NWA USA on FITE TV and YouTube.

Production

Storylines
The event featured professional wrestling matches that involved different wrestlers from pre-existing scripted feuds and storylines. Wrestlers portrayed heroes, villains, or less distinguishable characters in scripted events that built tension and culminated in a wrestling match or series of matches. Storylines were produced during the eighth season and second season, respectively, of the NWA's weekly web series, Powerrr and USA.

On Night 2 of the Crockett Cup, Homicide defeated Austin Aries, Darius Lockhart, and Colby Corino in a four-way match to win the reactivated NWA World Junior Heavyweight Championship. On April 7, it was announced that Corino would challenge for the title against Homicide at PowerrTrip 2.

Results

References

External links

2022 in professional wrestling
2022 in Kentucky
Events in Kentucky
Professional wrestling in Kentucky
February 2022 events in the United States
National Wrestling Alliance shows